Shamixanthone is a chemical compound, classified as a prenylated xanthone, that has been isolated from several species of Aspergillus, including Aspergillus turkensis.

References

Xanthones
Heterocyclic compounds with 3 rings